Norco Co-operative Limited is an agricultural supply and marketing co-operative based in northern New South Wales, Australia. 
Established in 1895, it sells products and services locally and internationally. Its 200+ dairy farm members supply over 200 million litres of milk to its two milk bottling factories (Raleigh- near Coffs Harbour, NSW and Labrador- on the Gold Coast, Queensland) and Ice Cream factory in Lismore, NSW. 
Its milk brands include "Norco", "FM", "Mighty Cool", "Real Iced Coffee" and "Tornado Shake". It also produces "home brand" milk and ice cream for Coles and Aldi, and has a fledgling Fresh Milk export business in China.

Norco is situated on the north coast of New South Wales and its primary activities extend along the agriculturally rich 
and diverse northern New South Wales and southern Queensland coastal strip.

References

Australian companies established in 1895
Food and drink companies established in 1895
Agriculture companies of Australia
Dairy products companies of Australia
Agricultural cooperatives
Lismore, New South Wales
Cooperatives in Australia
Companies based in New South Wales